Boruiyeh, also rendered as Burruiyeh, may refer to:
 Boruiyeh, Fars
 Boruiyeh, Yazd